5 Ingredient Fix is a television series starring Claire Robinson, the premise of which is that she creates entrées solely from five main ingredients.

References

External links
5 Ingredient Fix on FoodNetwork.com

Food Network original programming
2000s American cooking television series
2009 American television series debuts